In Greek mythology, Cromus (Ancient Greek: Κρῶμος, Κρόμου or Κρώμου) may refer to two different personages:

 Cromus, an Arcadian prince as one of the 50 sons of the impious King Lycaon either by the naiad Cyllene, Nonacris or by unknown woman. The city of Cromi in Arcadia was named after him.
 Cromus, a Corinthian son of Poseidon and the eponym of Crommyon. The latter was the home of the Crommyonian Sow which was subdued by the hero Theseus.

Notes

References 

 Dionysus of Halicarnassus, Roman Antiquities. English translation by Earnest Cary in the Loeb Classical Library, 7 volumes. Harvard University Press, 1937-1950. Online version at Bill Thayer's Web Site
Dionysius of Halicarnassus, Antiquitatum Romanarum quae supersunt, Vol I-IV. . Karl Jacoby. In Aedibus B.G. Teubneri. Leipzig. 1885. Greek text available at the Perseus Digital Library.
Pausanias, Description of Greece with an English Translation by W.H.S. Jones, Litt.D., and H.A. Ormerod, M.A., in 4 Volumes. Cambridge, MA, Harvard University Press; London, William Heinemann Ltd. 1918. . Online version at the Perseus Digital Library
 Pausanias, Graeciae Descriptio. 3 vols. Leipzig, Teubner. 1903.  Greek text available at the Perseus Digital Library.

Sons of Lycaon
Children of Poseidon
Princes in Greek mythology
Arcadian characters in Greek mythology
Arcadian mythology